In mathematics, the Bell series is a formal power series used to study properties of arithmetical functions. Bell series were introduced and developed by Eric Temple Bell.

Given an arithmetic function  and a prime , define the formal power series , called the Bell series of  modulo   as:

 for all primes .

Then for every prime , one has: 

In particular, this makes it trivial to find the Bell series of a Dirichlet inverse.

If  is completely multiplicative, then formally:

Examples

The following is a table of the Bell series of well-known arithmetic functions.

 The Möbius function  has 
 The Mobius function squared has 
 Euler's totient  has 
 The multiplicative identity of the Dirichlet convolution  has 
 The Liouville function  has 
 The power function Idk has   Here, Idk is the completely multiplicative function  . 
 The divisor function  has 
 The constant function, with value 1, satisfies , i.e., is the geometric series.
 If  is the power of the prime omega function, then 
Then  
 If  denotes the Mobius function of order k, then

See also
 Bell numbers

References
 

Arithmetic functions
Mathematical series